Live from Austin, TX is singer-songwriter John Hiatt's nineteenth album and his second live album, released in 2005. It was recorded for the PBS show Austin City Limits in 1993 on the tour supporting Perfectly Good Guitar. A DVD from the show was also released on the same date.

Track listing
All tracks written by John Hiatt except where noted.
"Icy Blue Heart" – 4:16
"Love in a Hurricane" – 4:06
"When You Hold Me Tight" – 5:55
"Your Dad Did – 6:05
"Straight Outta Time" – 6:17
"Memphis in the Meantime" – 4:31
"Something Wild" – 6:58
"Have a Little Faith in Me" – 4:13
"Buffalo River Home" – 5:37
"Thing Called Love" – 6:10
"Angel" – 3:35
"Tennessee Plates" – 3:58 (Hiatt, Mike Porter)
"Slow Turning" – 6:18
"Perfectly Good Guitar" – 5:49

Personnel
John Hiatt – guitar, vocals
Michael Ward – guitar
Michael Urbano – drums
Davey Faragher – bass guitar

References

John Hiatt albums
2005 live albums
New West Records live albums
2005 video albums
New West Records video albums
Live video albums
Austin City Limits